Penywaun (also in ) is a community, electoral ward and north-western suburb of Aberdare in the Cynon Valley within the county borough of Rhondda Cynon Taf, Wales. At the 2011 census, the population of the ward was registered as 3,063.

Etymology
Penywaun derives from two common Welsh toponyms "Pen" meaning top or head and "Gwaun" meaning moorland. Writing in 1887, Thomas Morgan states that the toponym (which he spells "Penwaun") indicates the end of the moor known as the Hirwaun Gwrgant or Gwrgan's "Waun".

Background
Much of the local housing was built by the local Aberdare urban district council after the Second World War in several stages, starting with simple pre-fabricated houses.

Shops and businesses trading in the village include a post office, a newsagents, hairdresser, a traditional fish and chip shop, and three grocery-type stores, one opposite the Colliers Arms pub.  Most of the retail is in a retail precinct ('the Shopping Centre').

Schools
Primary Schools
Penywaun Primary School, near Coed Glas, educates approximately 252 pupils, aged 3 to 11.
Main secondary education schools are: 
Ysgol Gyfun Rhydywaun a Welsh Medium comprehensive school, serving the village since 1995.
Aberdare High School
Aberdare Girls' School
Bishop Hedley High School (a Roman Catholic secondary school in Merthyr Tydfil)
St. John's The Baptist High School Of Aberdare.
Vocational and Further Education courses
Coleg Morgannwg (Aberdare campus) is in the next village of Trecynon

Culture

Saint Winifred Church - see photograph - (Church in Wales) is in the centre of the village. St Lleurwg Church in Hirwaun is the sister church sharing (co-serving) the Parish of Hirwaun.

Penywaun Workingmen's Club and Institute (PWCI) began in the village in 1959.  Many successful singers and entertainers have performed here, including Sir Tom Jones shortly before his rise to stardom in the 1960s.

Politics
Penywaun is also an electoral ward for Rhondda Cynon Taf County Borough Council. The County Borough Councillor until 2012 was Glyn Roberts (Labour), a long-serving Director of the Tower Colliery company. Since May 2012 the councillor has been Helen Boggis (Labour).

Sport, leisure and recreation
Penywaun F.C. plays soccer regularly in the Aberdare Valley Premier Division.

Penywaun is also home to an award-winning Tang Soo Do group which meet regularly at Penywaun Community Centre.

Two allotments (for gardening) are managed locally by Rhondda Cynon Taf Council.

Aberdare Park and Dare Valley Country Park are within two miles.

Notable people 
Kim Howells - Welsh Labour politician and MP for Pontypridd, born in Merthyr Tydfil, but raised in Penywaun
Dai Young (rugby footballer) - Lived in Penywaun for many years with his parents

References

External links 
2001 Census data
Penywaun Online, the local community magazine
Penywaun on Flickr, a photo sharing website

Villages in Rhondda Cynon Taf
Aberdare
Communities in Rhondda Cynon Taf
Wards of Rhondda Cynon Taf